White is a 2016 Indian Malayalam-language romantic drama film directed by Uday Ananthan, starring Mammootty and Huma Qureshi. It marks the debut of Huma Qureshi in Malayalam cinema. The score and songs are composed by Rahul Raj. 

It was shot in Budapest, London, Bangalore, and Kerala.

White was released worldwide on 29 July 2016.

Plot

Roshni (Huma Qureshi) is an IT professional who works at a company in Bangalore. Later, she gets a similar job in London. Her friend Deepa (Sona Nair) gets a job in New York. They get separate together and goes to their countries. And she later got job in a company with a manager named Anwar Rasool (Shankar Ramakrishnan) and they worked very hard.
 
Six months later, at a railway station, she saves a man named Prakash Roy (Mammootty) a businessman who wanted to commit suicide by being hit by a train. He gets slept with her hip. But she knows that he had been drinking alcohol and she left him at the train.
 
His Butler Raymond, calls her that it was she who left Prakash Roy at the Train and the CCTV footage have seen this and she cames to the office at the 5th floor. When she cames and sees Prakash Roy she knows that he is a Malayali. Jealously, she put the plate and broke it. she mistakenly recognises that he is a Womanizer. later at night she sees a Wallet. And she put the wallet on the dustbin when she cames to his home.
 
When he calls, she put the wallet on the dustbin. He calls her that she want to come to a place at Cemetery. which she want to meet him. When she meets him at the place she gives the wallet. When he want to friendship with her, she refuses. And when she in the office, prakash roy was camed their. and taken her to a cafe and she goes when she refuses as an overreacting. But, he left and she gets a gift a courier from her friend and she gets a scolding from anwar till morning and night.
 
At night, prakash roy celebrates her birthday party at the roadside. He knows that it was her birthday and gives her gift from prakash roy. And later she spent and enjoys with him at casino, bar, and factory etc.

Cast

 Mammootty as Prakash Roy
 Huma Qureshi in a dual role as Roshni Menon and Eleena Prakash Roy
 Siddique as Pradeep Roy
 Sona Nair as Deepa Pradeep
 Sunil Sukhada as Thambichayan
 K. P. A. C. Lalitha as Mariyamma
 Shankar Ramakrishnan as Anwar Rasool
 Tearry Konjanthed as Mrs. Duyi Suchard
 Ansar Kalabhavan as Boss
 Bitu Thomas
 John Millichap as Raymond, the butler
 Salvatore Ferragamo in a cameo as "10KSalivathorefurrgmo"

Music
The film score and soundtrack of the movie were composed Rahul Raj. The soundtrack album, featuring three songs, was released by Eros Music.

Release
The film was released on 29 July 2016. The film received mixed reviews. The satellite rights were given to Surya TV.

References

External links
 

Films shot in Bangalore
2010s Malayalam-language films
Films scored by Rahul Raj
Films set in London